The 1990–91 NBA season was the Clippers' 21st season in the National Basketball Association, and their 7th season in Los Angeles. Finishing near the bottom of the NBA continued to leave the Clippers with high draft choices, selecting Bo Kimble out of Loyola Marymount with the 8th pick, and Loy Vaught from the University of Michigan with the 13th pick in the 1990 NBA draft. Through the first six weeks, the Clippers were sailing around .500. with a 10–10 record. However, they would struggle losing 12 of their next 13 games, as Ron Harper only played just 39 games due to a knee injury. At midseason, Benoit Benjamin was traded to the Seattle SuperSonics in exchange for Olden Polynice. Despite winning five straight games in late March, the Clippers finished sixth in the Pacific Division with a 31–51 record, topping 50 losses for the tenth consecutive season.

Charles D. Smith led the team with 20.0 points, 8.2 rebounds and 2.0 blocks per game, while Harper averaged 19.6 points, 5.4 assists and 1.7 steals per game, and Ken Norman provided the team with 17.4 points and 7.1 rebounds per game. In addition, Danny Manning provided with 15.9 points, 5.8 rebounds and 1.6 steals per game, while Gary Grant contributed 8.7 points, 8.6 assists and 1.5 steals per game, and Winston Garland contributed 8.2 points, 4.6 assists and 1.4 steals per game. 

Following the season, Garland was traded to the Denver Nuggets.

Draft picks

Roster

Roster notes
 Center Mike Smrek became the 4th former Laker to play with the crosstown rival Clippers.

Regular season

Season standings

y - clinched division title
x - clinched playoff spot

z - clinched division title
y - clinched division title
x - clinched playoff spot

Record vs. opponents

Game log

Player statistics

Awards and records

Transactions
The Clippers were involved in the following transactions during the 1990–91 season.

Trades

Free agents

Additions

Subtractions

Player Transactions Citation:

See also
 1990-91 NBA season

References

Los Angeles Clippers seasons